Jade Wind Farm is a wind farm near Wilhelmshaven in Lower Saxony. It was built in 1989 as a test field for wind turbines in the area of the northern district Sengwarden. The wind farm is about 5 km away from the Innenjade. It is known for its range of types of wind turbines including the Aeolus II and Enercon E-112 and the single-blade MBB Monopteros M50 from different manufacturers.

References

Wind farms in Germany
Economy of Lower Saxony